Alphonsus Mathias (born on June 22, 1928, in Pangala, India) is a retired Roman Catholic archbishop of the archdiocese of Bangalore.

Biography
He was ordained a priest on 24 August 1954 and was appointed as the bishop of  the Diocese of Chikmagalur on 16 November 1963. The Apostolic Internuncio in India James Knox consecrated him on 5 February of the next year to the bishop ; co-consecrators were Albert Vincent D'Souza, Archbishop of Calcutta, and Raymond D'Mello, Bishop of Allahabad.

Mathias attended the Second Vatican Council. On 12 September 1986, he was appointed Archbishop of Bangalore, a role in which he served until he resigned on 24 March 1998. He was the president of the Catholic Bishops' Conference of India from 1989 to 1994.

References

External links
 catholic-hierarchy.org

Roman Catholic archbishops of Bangalore
1928 births
Living people
People from Udupi district